Mansfield City School District is a public school district serving students in the city of Mansfield, and northwestern parts of Madison Township in Richland County, Ohio, United States. The school district enrolls 4,591 students as of the 2012-2013 academic year.

Schools

Elementary schools 
Prospect Elementary School (Grades K through 3rd)
John Sherman Elementary School (Grades K through 3rd)
Woodland Elementary School (Grades K through 3rd)
Spanish Immersion Elementary School (Grades Pre-K through 6th)
Springmill STEM Elementary School (Grades K-3)

Intermediate schools
Malabar Intermediate School (Grades 4th through 6th)

Middle schools
Mansfield Middle School (Grades 7th and 8th)

High schools
Mansfield Senior High School (Grades 9th through 12th) 
Alternative School (Grades 1st through 2nd

Former schools
Appleseed Middle School (288 Cline Avenue) - built in 1940, closed in 1989 and converted into Cline Avenue Campus of Mansfield Senior for ninth-graders, who were housed there from 1989 to 2003. In 2004, the old school building that once housed Appleseed Middle School and Cline Avenue Campus of Mansfield Senior was demolished.
Brinkerhoff Elementary School (218 Marion Avenue) - built in 1884, closed in 1949, demolished in 1979
Brinkerhoff Elementary School (240 Euclid Avenue) - was converted to Brinkerhoff Intermediate School in 2007 and in 2010 was converted to Spanish Immersion Elementary School
Carpenter Elementary School (335 Marion Avenue) - built in 1950, closed in 2007 (now houses OhioHealth MedCentral Agencies)
Creveling School (455 Bowman Street) - built in 1950, closed in 1978 (now houses the Mansfield Elective Academy)
Empire Elementary School (395 Pomerene Road) - built in 1956, closed in 1989 and was demolished in 2009
Flemming Falls School (452 Annadale Avenue) - built in 1956, closed in 1989
Hedges Elementary School (176 Hedges Street) - built in 1911, 1950 and 1956, was converted to Hedges Intermediate School in 2007, closed in 2010 (now houses the Learns Academy)
Malabar High School (205 West Cook Road) - was converted into Malabar Middle School in 1989 and in 2010 was converted into Malabar Intermediate School
Mansfield High School (218 West Fourth Street) - built in 1892 as Mansfield's first high school located at 218 West Fourth Street (West Fourth at Bowman Street) and relocated in 1927 when a new high school on West Park Boulevard was completed. The old high school was demolished in 1939 to make way for the new John Simpson Middle School.
Mansfield Senior High School (109 West Park Boulevard) - built in 1927, demolished in July 2004 after a new Mansfield Senior High School at 124 North Linden Road was completed. The new and current Mansfield Senior High School opened at the beginning of the 2004-05 school year.
Newman Elementary School (457 Central Avenue) - built in 1947, closed in 2014
Raemelton School (South Trimble Road at Marion Avenue) - demolished in 2000s
Raemelton Elementary School (856 West Cook Road) - closed in 1978 (now houses the district central office)
Ranchwood Elementary School (1033 Larchwood Road) - built in 1956, closed in 2007 (now houses the Community Center)
Rebecca Grubaugh School (87 Western Avenue) - built in 1911 as Western Avenue School. The school was renamed Rebecca Grubaugh School in 1948 and closed in 1978. (now houses Western Avenue Apartments)
Roseland Elementary School (777 North Trimble Road) - built in 1947, closed in 1989 (now houses the Foundation Academy of Mansfield)
John Sherman Middle School (1138 Springmill Street) - converted into John Sherman Elementary School in 1989
John Simpson Middle School (218 West Fourth Street) - built in 1939, closed in 2007. John Simpson Middle School was demolished late March, early April 2014.
Springmill Elementary School (1200 Nestor Drive) - built in 1961, was converted to Springmill Intermediate School in 2007, closed in 2010 (now houses the Science Center)
Stadium Elementary School (165 North Trimble Road) - built in 1957, closed in 1989 (now houses STAR School)
West Fifth Elementary School (150 West Fifth Street) - built in 1948, closed in 1989

Consolidation
From the 1960s until 1989, Mansfield had two high schools, Senior High and Malabar, as well as three middle schools, Simpson, Sherman and Appleseed. Due to budgetary considerations, in fall 1989 Malabar was converted into a middle school, with all high school students being centralized at Senior High, with the exception of the ninth-graders, who were housed in the former Appleseed Middle School, dubbed the Cline Avenue Campus. Sherman became an elementary school, and several elementary schools were closed down, among them West Fifth and Stadium. Rae Melton Elementary, on the south side, had been closed and converted to administrative offices a decade earlier. From the 1990s until 2007, Mansfield had one high school, Senior High, two middle schools, Malabar and Simpson housing sixth through eighth graders, as well as nine elementary schools housing K through fifth graders. In fall 2003, the Cline Avenue Campus would close for good, relocating all ninth-graders to Senior High and in fall 2004, the new Mansfield Senior High School opens. Due to budgetary considerations once again, in fall 2007 John Simpson Middle School, as well as two elementary schools, Carpenter and Ranchwood were closed down for good leaving only one middle school, Malabar housing only seventh and eighth graders, and seven elementary schools, turning three of them, Brinkerhoff, Hedges and Springmill into intermediate schools housing fourth through sixth graders. In 2010, the district consolidated further. Seventh and eighth graders were moved from Malabar Middle School to their own wing in Mansfield Senior High School. All of the fourth through sixth grade students were moved to the Malabar school, now called Malabar Intermediate School. Hedges and Springmill Intermediate Schools were closed. Brinkerhoff Intermediate School was converted to the Spanish Immersion School. The central office personnel was moved from Mansfield Senior High School to the former Raemelton School.

Notable alumni
Wilbur "Pete" Henry, member college football hall of fame, Washington & Jefferson College 1915-1919, inaugural member NFL Hall Of Fame(1920–1926 Canton Bulldogs, 1927 New York Giants, 1927–1928 
Pottsville Maroons)
Sherrod Brown, US Senator (D) Ohio
Hugh Douglas, retired NFL player (1995 Defensive Rookie of the year with the Jets, two stints with the Eagles, Jaguars)

References

External links
Mansfield City School District official website

Mansfield, Ohio
Education in Richland County, Ohio
School districts in Ohio